Simona is a 1974 Italian erotic drama film directed by Patrick Longchamps and starring Laura Antonelli, Maurizio Degli Esposti and Raf Vallone.

Cast
Laura Antonelli as Simona
Maurizio Degli Esposti as Georges 
Raf Vallone as L'oncle de Marcelle / Marcelle's uncle 
Yvette Merlin as La mère de Simone / Simone's mother 
Marc Audier
Ramon Berry
Michel Lechat
Patrick Magee as Le père 
Margot Margaret as La marquise Marcelle de la Paille 
Jo Maxane as Marcelle's mother 
Quentin Milo as Gille 
Germaine Pascal
John Trigger as foreigner

References

External links

Italian erotic drama films
1970s erotic drama films
1974 drama films
Films scored by Fiorenzo Carpi
1970s Italian films